Bath City Football Club is a semi-professional Football Club based in Bath, Somerset, England. The club is affiliated with the Somerset FA and currently competes in the National League South. The club have played their home matches at Twerton Park since 1932.

This list encompasses the major honours won by Bath City, records set by the club, and awards achieved by the players and managers. The player records section includes details of the club's leading goalscorers and those who have made the most appearances in first-team competitions. The club's record appearance maker is Dave Mogg, who made 515 appearances between 1982 and 1997. Charlie Fleming was the club's record goalscorer, scoring 216 goals in total.

Honours

Player records

Top 10 all-time appearances

Goalscorers
 Most goals scored (in a season)  – 51, Paul Randall (1989–90)
 Most League goals scored (in a season)  – 37, Charlie Fleming

Top 10 all-time scorers

Player of the Season and Golden Boot winners 

The following table shows players who have been named the Supporters' Player of the Season and have received the Golden Boot award for scoring the most goals (all competitions) in a season. The table is in chronological order and begins from the 1984–85 season:

Transfers
For consistency, fees in the record transfer tables below are all sourced from BBC Sport's contemporary reports of each transfer.

Record transfer fees paid

Record transfer fees received

Managerial records 

 Longest-serving manager by time: Ted Davis, from 22 June 1927 to 10 June 1937 and from 4 May 1939 to 3 June 1947 (17 years)
 Most successful manager: Ted Davis, two fourth tier titles, four Somerset Premier Cups and one Football League North
 Manager with the highest average league position: Ted Davis, (5th in tier four) 1927–1937, and Brian Godfrey, 1976–1979 (3rd in tier five)

Team records

Cup runs 
 Best FA Cup performance – Third Round (6 times):

 vs Brentford (1931–32)
 vs Norwich City (1934–35)
 vs Brighton & Hove Albion (1959–60)
 vs Bolton Wanderers (1963–64)
 vs Mansfield Town (1987–88)
 vs Stoke City (1993–94)

 Best FA Trophy performance – Semi-finals 
 vs North Ferriby United (2014–15)

Points 

 Most points in a season:

 Two points for a win: 67 in 42 matches, Southern League, 1959–60  (Tier 5)
 Three points for a win: 91 in 42 matches, Southern Football League, 2007–08 (Tier 7)

 Fewest points in a season:

 Two points for a win: 26 in 42 matches, Southern League, 1971–72 (Tier 5)
 Three points for a win: 31 in 46 matches, National League, 2011–12 (Tier 5)

League position 

 Highest League position:

 First in the Southern League (Western Section), (1929–30), 1932–33) (Tier 4)

 Lowest League position:

 Sixth in the Southern Football League, (2004–05) (Tier 7)

Attendance 

 Record home attendance – 18,020 vs Brighton & Hove Albion, (FA Cup third round, 9 January 1960)

 Record League attendance – 17,000 vs Aston Villa, (Football League North, 14 April 1944)
 Record away attendance played in –  26,983 vs Bolton Wanderers F.C., (FA Cup third round, 8 January 1964)
 Record National League South attendance – 3,492 vs Torquay United (19 January 2019)
 Lowest average attendance –  500  (National League South, 2014–15)
 Highest average attendance  – 4,940 (Southern League Premier, 1959–60)

European record
In 1977 and 1978, Bath City were one of six clubs to represent England in the Anglo-Italian Cup, a now defunct European football competition. They qualified as the English finalist in both tournaments but lost to Lecco (1977) and Udinese (1978) respectively. During the group stage of the 1977 tournament, the club recorded impressive victories over Parma and Bari.

Season-by-season performance

Notes

References

External links 

 Official website
 Bath City Youth FC website 
 Bath City F.C. on BBC Sport: results and fixtures
 Vanarama National League Official website
 Supporters' Society

 

 
City F.C.